Austin Herink (born August 16, 1995) is an American football coach and former quarterback, who is currently the Associate Director of Football Operations for Nebraska University. He played college football at East Tennessee State. After going undrafted in the 2019 NFL draft, Herink signed with the Vienna Vikings for the spring 2019 season. He then retired and became an assistant coach at East Tennessee State. He is one of the most prolific quarterbacks in the history of East Tennessee State. He led the 2018 team to the third-best record in school history (8-4) and the program's first playoff game in over 20 years, as well as a share of the Southern Conference Championship. He was also a four-time team captain from 2015 to 2018.

Early life
Born the son of Jeff and Donita Herink, Herink grew up in Cleveland, Tennessee where he would play football for Coach Ron Crawford at Cleveland High School. He also won letters in basketball. In his career, he passed for over 6,000 yards, combined for 67 touchdowns (52 passing/15 rushing) and completed .668 percent (472-of-706) of his passes. He would also be named District Player of the Year and All-State selection.

College career
During his recruiting process, Herink was not offered by many schools despite his high statistics and personal accomplishments. He was ranked just a two-star prospect. Though he was originally recruited by ETSU, the team ultimately signed another quarterback. Before committing to MTSU he was recruited by UT Martin, Eastern Kentucky and Youngstown State. Most noticeably were the D1 SEC schools that had an interest such as Alabama, Auburn, UTK and Vanderbilt. However, none offered Herink a scholarship during the recruiting process. After graduation from Cleveland High School, Herink joined the Middle Tennessee State football team in 2014. One year later, he transferred to East Tennessee State to help reboot their football team in the 2015 and where there would be plenty of playing time. There would start for all four years (2015-2018) and become one of the best quarterbacks in the school's history. While at ETSU, Herink studied sports management.

2015 Season
In 2015, he started all 11 games at quarterback for the Bucs and was named to the SoCon Academic Honor Roll. He led the team in completions (116), passing yards (1,261), passing touchdowns (6) and completion percentage (60.4). He also rushed for 155 yards and five touchdowns. He earned two Bowman Jewelers Offensive Player of the Week honors (Maryville and Kentucky Wesleyan). He totaled a season-high 261 passing yards against Emory and Henry (Sept. 26). He rushed for a season-best 134 yards in the win over Kentucky Wesleyan (Nov. 21), as well as rushing for two touchdowns and threw for three scores with 220 passing yards against the Panthers. In that game, he completed 14 of his 17 passes vs. KWC. He would also go 10-of-13 at Charleston Southern (Sept. 17) and 11-for-15 vs. Maryville (Sept. 10). He threw and rushed for one touchdown in the win over Warner (Oct. 31).

2016 Season
This season he was named to SoCon All-Academic Team and SoCon Honor Roll. He would be named SoCon Offensive Player of the Week following ETSU’s win over Western Carolina at Bristol Motor Speedway (Sept. 17) He would once again start all 11 games at quarterback for the Blue & Gold. He would pass for 1,695 yards and seven touchdowns with a completion percentage of .596 (161-for-270) and rushed for 106 yards and three touchdowns. He Ranked seventh in the SoCon in passing yards per game (154.1), passing efficiency (115.0) and total offense per game (163.7). He would pass for a then career-high 269 yards and three touchdowns in the Bucs’ win over Western Carolina, as well as set a career high in completions (25) at Mercer (Nov. 5). He Recorded at least one touchdown pass in the Bucs’ final four games of the season (The Citadel, Mercer, Cumberland and No. 18 Samford). He also rushed for two touchdowns in the win over West Virginia Wesleyan (Oct. 20).

2017 Season
In the 2017 season, he was named to the SoCon Fall Academic Team and SoCon Honor Roll, as well as being named SoCon Student-Athlete of the Week on Sept. 27. He broke ETSU’s single-game passing record with a 434-yard game at Furman on Sept. 30 and ranked among the Bucs’ single-season leaders in pass attempts (322, 4th), completions (182, 5th), passing yards (2,213, 6th) and passing touchdowns (14, T-7th). He would also rank fifth in the SoCon in total offense (201.7) and total offensive touchdowns (15). He tied a career-high with three touchdown passes in the season-opening win against Limestone and Furman, and set a new single-game program record by completing 15 straight passes to start against Limestone. The longest pass of his career would also occur against Furman with a 78-yard pass.

2018 Season
Herink would define his career in 2018, as he would lead East Tennessee State to the FCS playoffs for the first time since 1996 and to their first-ever share of the SoCon championship. He was once again named to the SoCon Honor Roll and SoCon Fall Academic Team. He concluded the season with 1,825 passing yards with six touchdowns in 11 games played (eight starts). Two of his six touchdown passes were a season-high 54 yards (vs. Furman (Sept. 22) and Chattanooga (Sept. 29)). Capped off the year with a .591 (156-of-264) completion percentage, completing a season-high 28 passes and 294 yards against Western Carolina (Oct. 27). He tallied 174 yards on the ground in 74 attempts with four touchdowns, and would rank fifth in the SoCon in total offense with 1,999 yards. He finished his career ranked second in program history in pass attempts (1,048), completions (615) and completion percentage (.587), while ranking third in yards (6,994) and fifth in touchdowns (33).

College statistics

Professional career

After completing his collegiate career, Herink began to prepare for the possibility of playing in the NFL. However, he went undrafted and unsigned. He then signed with the Vienna Vikings for the spring 2019 season. Herink was the quarterback and assistant passing game coordinator for the Vienna Vikings, a pro football club in Vienna, Austria. He led the team to a second-place finish in both the Austrian Football League and the European Football League. Statistically, Herink finished the Austrian Football League season ranked 2nd in passing yards, 4th in TD passes and 4th in passer rating.

Coaching career
Herink was named the Director of Player Personnel/Data Analytics at his alma mater, East Tennessee State, in 2019. With the Buccaneers, he assisted Head Coach Randy Sanders and the offensive coaching staff with game planning, while also instructing quarterbacks on proper mechanics, game planning and scheme knowledge. Herink also helped coordinate unofficial and official recruiting visits. In 2021, Herink was Associate Director of Football Operations. Herink assists with all facets of the day-to-day operations of the football program, including serving as a liaison with other units within the athletic department, assisting with budgets, team travel, and summer camps and clinics.

References

External links
 East Tennessee State Buccaneers bio

1995 births
Living people
American football quarterbacks
Coaches of American football from Tennessee
East Tennessee State Buccaneers football players
Players of American football from Tennessee
People from Cleveland, Tennessee
American expatriate players of American football
American expatriate sportspeople in Austria